The Warburton River (or Warburton Creek) is a freshwater stream in the far north of South Australia that flows in a south westerly direction and discharges into the eastern side of Lake Eyre. It is one of the state's largest rivers, and is part of the Lake Eyre Basin. It runs along the eastern side of the Simpson Desert, and drains water from Eyre Creek, the Diamantina and Georgina rivers from Goyder Lagoon, carrying it into Lake Eyre during its infrequent floods.

The river passes through a number of permanent and semi-permanent waterholes including Poothapootha waterhole, Emu Bone waterhole, Wurdoopoothanie waterhole and Kalawarranna soakage.

There are seven tributaries of the river; Warburton Creek, Macumba River, Officer Creek, Kallakoopah Creek, Yelpawaralinna Creek and Derwent Creek.

See also

References 

Rivers of South Australia
Lake Eyre basin
Far North (South Australia)